Uzdin (Serbian Cyrillic: Уздин, Romanian: Uzdâni) is a village located in the Kovačica municipality, in the South Banat District of Serbia. It is situated in the autonomous province of Vojvodina. The village has a Romanian ethnic majority (76.42%) and its population is 2,029 (2011 census) spread over 71,36 km² of land.

At the turn of the 20th century, its population was approximately 7000. The dramatic decrease is consistent with the decrease of the Romanian population throughout Vojvodina, reflecting emigration, low natality . The village loses about each year 2,2% of its inhabitants.

Uzdin is famous as a center for the cultural activities of Romanians in Serbia, including naive painting, the Table Tenis Club "Unirea", the publication of the newspaper Tibiscus and other literature as well as the nurturing of Romanian folk music and dance and the hosting of music festivals. 

Romanian Orthodoxy is the most prevalent form of religion in Uzdin.

References

Populated places in South Banat District
Populated places in Serbian Banat
Kovačica
Romanian communities in Serbia